Roze Stiebra (born Rozālija Stiebra on 17 March 1942) is a Latvian animator.

Biography 
Roze Stiebra was born on 17 March 1942 in Riga. She graduated from the Faculty of Puppetry at the Saint Petersburg State Theatre Arts Academy in 1964, and went on to work as an animator for Latvian Television (studio Telefilm-Riga 1966–1987), Riga Film Studio (1987–1990) and the animation studio Dauka (since 1991)).

She has received the Lielais Kristaps award for "best animated film" six times, for her films Kā es braucu Ziemeļmeitas lūkoties (1980), Kabata (1983), Skatāmpanti (1988), Ness un Nesija (1993), Pasaciņas. Miega vilcieniņš (1998), and The Unusual Rigans (2001).

She is a member of the International Animated Film Association. In 1995, she was honored with the Spīdolas Award, the highest award of the Latvian Culture Foundation.  In 2005, Stiebra received the Order of the Three Stars.

References

Further reading

External links
 Roze Stiebra at Animator.ru
 

1942 births
Living people
20th-century Latvian women artists
21st-century Latvian women artists
Latvian animators
Soviet animators
Latvian animated film directors
Latvian film directors
Latvian women animators
Latvian women film directors
Film people from Riga
Lielais Kristaps Award winners
Russian State Institute of Performing Arts alumni